Al-Fatiha (alternatively transliterated Al-Fātiḥa or Al-Fātiḥah; ,), is the first surah (chapter) of the Quran. It consists of 7 ayah (verses) which are a prayer for guidance and mercy. Al-Fatiha is recited in Muslim obligatory and voluntary prayers, known as salah.

Quranic chapter titles are not considered by Muslims to be part of the divine revelation of the Quran. The primary literal meaning of the expression "Al-Fatiha" is "The Opener/The Key", which could refer to this Surah being the first in the Quran, the first chapter recited in full in every rakat of salah, or to the manner in which it serves as an opening for many functions in everyday Islamic life. Some Muslims interpret it as a reference to an implied ability of the Surah to open a person to faith in God.

Summary 
Surah Al-Fatiha is narrated in the Hadith to have been divided into two halves between God and His servant (the person reciting), the first three verses being His half and last three being the servant's. There is disagreement as to whether the Bismillah is the first verse of the surah, or even a verse in the first place. The chapter begins by praising God with the phrase Alhamdulillah, and stating that it is God who has full authority over all creations (verse 1/2), that He is Ar-Rahman Ar-Rahim or the Most Gracious and Most Merciful (verse 2/3), and that He is and will be the true owner of everything and everyone on the Day of Judgement (verse 3/4).

The final three verses, which comprise the servant's half, begin with the servant stating that they worship and seek only God's help (verse 4/5), asking Him to guide them to the Sirat al-Mustaqim (the Straight Path) of those who God has been bountiful to, and not of those who have earned His anger (verses 5-6/6-7).

Some Muslim commentators believe Jews and Christians are examples of those evoking God's anger and those who went astray, respectively. Others view this as an exclusive condemnation of all Jews and Christians from all times. The Noble Quran (Hilali–Khan), which is said to be the most widely disseminated Quran in most Islamic bookstores and Sunni mosques throughout the English-speaking world, defines the two groups as Jews and Christians respectively.

Other Muslim commentators have not interpreted these verses as referring exclusively to a specific group of people, but instead interpret these in the more general sense.

Verses and meaning 

[Bismi l-lāhi r-raḥmāni r-raḥīm(i)] 
 In the name of God, the Most Compassionate, Most Merciful.  

[’alḥamdu lil-lāhi rab-bi l-‘ālamīn(a)] 
 All praise is for God - Lord of all worlds – 

[’ar-raḥmāni r-raḥīm(i)] 
 the Most Compassionate, Most Merciful, 

[Māliki yawmi d-dīn(i)] 

[’iy-yāka na‘budu wa’iy-yāka nasta‘īn(u)] 
 You ˹alone˺ we worship and You ˹alone˺ we ask for help..

[’ihdinā ṣ-ṣirāṭa l-mustaqīm(a)] 
 Guide us along the straight path –

[Ṣirāṭa l-ladhīna ’an‘amta ‘alayhim, ghayri l-maghḍūbi ‘alayhim wala ḍ-ḍāl-līn(a)] 
 the Path of those You have blessed — not those You are displeased with, or those who are astray.

With full tajweed symbols

بِسۡمِ ٱللَّهِ ٱلرَّحۡمَـٰنِ ٱلرَّحِیمِ ۝١ ٱلۡحَمۡدُ لِلَّهِ رَبِّ ٱلۡعَـٰلَمِینَ ۝٢ ٱلرَّحۡمَـٰنِ ٱلرَّحِیمِ ۝٣ مَـٰلِكِ یَوۡمِ ٱلدِّینِ ۝٤ إِیَّاكَ نَعۡبُدُ وَإِیَّاكَ نَسۡتَعِینُ ۝٥ ٱهۡدِنَا ٱلصِّرَ ٰ⁠طَ ٱلۡمُسۡتَقِیمَ ۝٦ صِرَ ٰ⁠طَ ٱلَّذِینَ أَنۡعَمۡتَ عَلَیۡهِمۡ غَیۡرِ ٱلۡمَغۡضُوبِ عَلَیۡهِمۡ وَلَا ٱلضَّاۤلِّینَ ۝٧

Background
The most commonly accepted view about the origins of the surah is the view of Ibn Abbas, among others, that Al-Fatiha is a Meccan surah, although some believe that it is either a Medinan surah or was revealed in both Mecca and Medina. Most narrators recorded that al-Fātiḥah was the first complete Surah revealed to Muhammad.

The name Al-Fatiha ("the Opener") could refer to the surah being the first in the Mus'hafs, the first to be recited in each rakat of salah, or to the manner of its usage in many Islamic traditions as an opening prayer. The word itself comes from the root , which means "to open, explain, disclose, conquer", etc. Al-Fatiha is also known by several other names, such as Al-Hamd (The Praise), As-Salah (The Prayer), Umm al-Kitab (Mother of the Book), Umm al-Quran (Mother of the Quran), Sab'a min al-Mathani (Seven Repeated Ones, from Quran 15:87), and Ash-Shifa' (The Cure).

Benefits and virtues
Muslims attribute special significance to some surahs for their virtues and benefits described in the hadith. Acceptance of the different hadith varies between Sunni and Shia Muslims, and there is a variety of terms to classify the different levels of confirmed authenticity of a hadith. However, both Sunnis and Shia believe Al-Fatiha to be one of the greatest surahs in the Quran, and a cure for several diseases and poisons.

See also
Basmala

Notes

References

Bibliography

External links 
Text of Surah al-Fatiha with multiple available translations

 
Chapters in the Quran
Salah